The UND Sports Network (UNDSN) was a regional sports network based in Grand Forks, North Dakota, operated by the University of North Dakota and WDAZ-TV.  The network operated from 2002 until March 2012; through 2010 the network was branded as the Fighting Sioux Sports Network (FSSN).  
WDAZ's sports director, Pat Sweeney, was the primary sports commentator for the network.

The channel was available in North Dakota, Minnesota, and South Dakota on cable television.  On Midcontinent Communications systems, it was commonly simulcast on the Midco Sports Network.  Select games were aired on Forum Communications TV stations WDAZ-TV, WDAY-TV, KBMY, and KMCY.

The UND Sports Network aired live telecasts of University of North Dakota athletics.  The channel carried all home men's hockey games, several away hockey games, and several football, women's hockey games, volleyball and basketball games throughout the season.  During its years of operation, some of UNDSN's programming was picked up by ESPNU or Fox College Sports.

Similar programming is now carried directly by Midco Sports Network.  The University of North Dakota Television Center also carries minor sports programming on its local cable channel, UND3.

References

External links
UNDSN web page on WDAZ.com

North Dakota Fighting Hawks
College sports television networks
Defunct local cable stations in the United States
Television channels and stations disestablished in 2012